Peachtree City is the largest city in Fayette County, Georgia, United States. As of the 2010 United States Census, it had a population of 34,364.  Peachtree City is located in South Metro Atlanta.

Peachtree City is noted for its extensive use of golf carts.

Geography
Peachtree City is located in western Fayette County in the southern Atlanta metro area. It is bordered to the west by Coweta County and to the north by the Town of Tyrone. It is crossed by Georgia State Route 74 and Georgia State Route 54. SR 54 leads east  to Fayetteville, the county seat, and southwest  to Luthersville.

The city is in the watershed of Line Creek, which forms the western city boundary and county line, and is a south-flowing tributary of the Flint River.

Peachtree City has three lakes. Lake Kedron to the north is a reservoir that supplies Lake Peachtree to the south via Flat Creek. Lake Kedron is owned by the Fayette County Authority, and is managed so as to keep Lake Peachtree full whenever there is a lack of rain and still allow for recreational use of the lake during droughts. Lake Kedron is not afforded any recreational use except for fishing.  Lake McIntosh, the newest lake, close to Planterra, has now reached full pool.

History

Timeline:
 In 1957, Flat Creek was dammed to create Lake Peachtree.
In 1959, Joel Cowan established the city's network of golf cart paths.
 In 1965, the Peachtree City volunteer fire department was created. The one-car Peachtree City police department was created. 
 In 1968, Falcon Field airport was founded by Joel Cowan as Peachtree City-Falcon Field. Peachtree City Elementary School opened. 
 In 1972, Peachtree City was granted its own ZIP code (30269).
 In 1974, the Peachtree City Public Library opened. The Georgia state legislature passed legislation permitting golf carts to be operated on city streets.
 In 1975, Peachtree City was named "one of America's best suburbs" by Ladies' Home Journal magazine.
 In 1976, Peachtree City got its own telephone exchange (487). Residents then had to dial "8" to reach Atlanta, which remained the case until digital equipment was installed in 1988.
 In 1976, Frederick Brown Jr. Amphitheater (then known as the Peachtree City Amphitheater) was built as a Bicentennial project and opened to the public with the production "The MacIntosh Trail", which told the story of Creek Chief William McIntosh and the Trail of Tears. (It was intended as a tourist attraction similar to the Cherokee, North Carolina, production of Unto These Hills.) When further funding was not forthcoming the project went into foreclosure. Peachtree City purchased the amphitheater at the courthouse steps in 1977.
 In 1979, the first traffic light within city limits was installed at the intersection of Georgia State Route 54 and Georgia State Route 74.
 In 1979, Gallopade International, Inc. was founded with corporate headquarters, publishing and warehousing facility in Peachtree City
 In 1981, McIntosh High School opened.
 In 1983, Peachtree City held a free music festival to celebrate the opening of several new shops and stores, including the Galaxy Games arcade. Several local bands played at the free event, including "Alliance".
 In 1984, Hoshizaki America, Inc. builds corporate headquarters, warehousing and manufacturing facility in Peachtree City 
 In 1992, Peachtree City altered the length of the mayoral and council members' terms of office from two to four years. Term limits were enacted to restrict both mayor and council members to a maximum of two four-year terms.
 In 1994, the first Summer Concert Series premiered at Frederick Brown Jr. Amphitheater on June 17, 1994, to a sold-out audience. The first concert featured Three Dog Night.
 In 1994, the National Weather Service central office relocated from Hartsfield–Jackson Atlanta International Airport.
 In 1994, Fuller Life Chiropractic Center opened its initial office.
 In 1996, the Olympic flame passed through on its way to Atlanta.
 In 2001, the city was designated a "Tree City USA" by the Arbor Day Foundation.
 In 2002, Peachtree City (specifically Starr's Mill) was a filming location for the movie Sweet Home Alabama.
 In 2007, the city announced a plan to formally annex an unincorporated area between Georgia State Route 74 and the border with Coweta County that is commonly referred to as "The West Village", or "Wilksmoor Village".
 In 2013, the  Lake McIntosh opened for public use.

Economy

 Cooper Lighting Solutions - formerly Eaton Corp – Lighting Division or Cooper Industries is headquartered in Peachtree City, and was acquired by Signify on March 2, 2020.
 Hoshizaki America, Inc. has its corporate headquarters and a warehousing and manufacturing facility in Peachtree City and employs over 700 people throughout the United States. It is a major supplier of Ice Machines /icemakers, Refrigerated Display Cases, Dispensers, Prep Tables, Commercial Refrigerators and Freezer for foodservice, hotels, restaurants, hospitals & nursing homes, schools and convenience stores.
 Panasonic Automotive Systems Company of America (PASA) has its main operations based in Peachtree City and is the largest employer in the city. It is a major supplier of automotive audio, video and navigation systems for Honda (including its Acura luxury division), Ford (Sync 3), Nissan, General Motors, Toyota and Subaru.
 The National Weather Service has an office in the city, serving most of Georgia's northern two-thirds. It is the only NWS office in the state of Georgia.
 Gallopade International, Inc. has its corporate headquarters, printing and warehousing facility in Peachtree City. The company publishes more than 15,000 educational products for children and adults, including the Carole Marsh series and complete school curriculums.

Other large employers in Peachtree City's industrial park include:
 Sany, a Chinese multinational heavy machinery manufacturer
 Osmose Utilities Services, Inc., a leading service provider safeguarding North American utility infrastructure
 TDK Corporation, a media storage device manufacturer
 Avery Dennison, a paper product company that manufactures decals and other adhesives
 NCR Corporation, formerly National Cash Register, a company that manufactures ATMs (ABM, computers and software)

In addition to working within the city, many Peachtree Citians commute to Atlanta.  Airlines, such as Delta, United, and Southwest, are major employers.

Recreation
Peachtree City has several golf and country clubs.

Sports

Soccer 
On January 8, 2016, the Premier Development League awarded a soccer franchise to Peachtree City. The Peachtree City MOBA football club's inaugural season was the 2016 season. The team is owned by Volker Harms, the owner of the state-of-the-art MOBA Soccer Academy in Peachtree City, and managed by former professional footballer Omar Jarun. 
The club plays out of MOBA Soccer Stadium at MOBA Soccer Academy.

Government

As of 2022, the mayor of Peachtree City is Kim Learnard. Council members include Phil Prebor, Mike King, Clint Holland, and Frank Destadio.

Climate

Demography

2020 census

As of the 2020 United States census, there were 38,244 people, 13,416 households, and 9,808 families residing in the city.

2000 census
As of the 2000 census, there were 31,580 people, 10,876 households, and 8,874 families residing in the city. The racial makeup of the city was 89.66% White, 4.11% African American, 0.16% Native American, 3.70% Asian, 0.03% Pacific Islander, 0.92% from other races, and 1.43% from two or more races. Hispanic or Latino people of any race were 3.75% of the population.

There were 10,876 households, out of which 47.1% had children under the age of 18 living with them, 70.8% were married couples living together, 8.4% had a female householder with no husband present, and 18.4% were non-families. 16.0% of all households were made up of individuals, and 5.7% had someone living alone who was 65 years of age or older. The average household size was 2.89 and the average family size was 3.25.

In the city, the population was spread out, with 31.6% under the age of 18, 5.8% from 18 to 24, 28.5% from 25 to 44, 26.2% from 45 to 64, and 8.0% who were 65 years of age or older. The median age was 38 years. For every 100 females, there were 95.2 males. For every 100 females age 18 and over, there were 90.7 males.

According to a 2007 estimate, the median income for a household in the city was $84,339, and the median income for a family was $96,880.

Education

Primary and secondary schools
Peachtree City is served by the Fayette County School System.

Elementary schools that serve the city include:
 Peeples Elementary School (Unincorporated Fayette County)
 Braelinn Elementary School (Peachtree City)
 Huddleston Elementary School (Peachtree City)
 Kedron Elementary School (Peachtree City)
 Oak Grove Elementary School (Peachtree City)
 Peachtree City Elementary School (Peachtree City)
 Crabapple Lane Elementary School (Peachtree City)

Middle schools that serve the city include:
 J.C. Booth Middle School (Peachtree City) – serves central and northern Peachtree City
 Rising Starr Middle School (Unincorporated Fayette County) – serves southern Peachtree City

High schools that serve the city include:
 McIntosh High School (Peachtree City) – serves central and northern Peachtree City
 Starr's Mill High School (Unincorporated Fayette County) – serves southern Peachtree City
 Whitewater High School – serves some of southeastern Peachtree City)

Private and non-traditional schools include:
 Our Lady of Victory Catholic School (Grades K-8) – elementary and middle school located in Tyrone
 Our Lady of Mercy Catholic High School – located in Fayetteville
 The Campus (Grades 1–12)
 Trinity Christian School (grades 1–12) – grades 1–8 are at the main campus; high school is at the old Crossroads Church
 Landmark Christian School (Grades 1–5) – this is an elementary campus; main campus is located in Fairburn, serving grades K4-12
 St. Paul Lutheran School (grades pre-K-8) – elementary and middle school, located inside Peachtree City at the intersection of Georgia Highway 74 and Ardenlee Drive

Colleges and universities
Universities that serve the city include:
 Clayton State University – This facility is at the north end of Peachtree Pkwy in Peachtree City. It offers dual-credit enrollment program for high school students.  Fayette has an instructional site with undergraduate degrees in business, psychology, integrative studies, administrative management, and technology management, and an MBA program with a concentration in logistics and supply chain management.
 Point University (formerly Atlanta Christian College) – This campus offers the Access program for adult learners and the dual-credit enrollment program for high school students.

The Phi Mu sorority is headquartered in Peachtree City.

Film and television
Lifetime's Drop Dead Diva was filmed in Peachtree City and surrounding areas of Fayette and Coweta County. With Raleigh Studios in nearby Senoia, Peachtree City has often been the backdrop for episodes of other series, such as The Walking Dead. Scenes from the film Joyful Noise were shot there as well.

Transportation

Golf carts
Peachtree City has a system of golf cart paths which spider across the town and provide a secondary means of access to almost any destination within city limits. These multi-use paths stretch for more than  throughout the city. Many places of business have specially designated golf cart parking spaces. The Peachtree City Police Department has several golf carts used to patrol along these paths.

Over 10,000 households own a golf cart, and use them as an extra vehicle for local transportation. Children aged twelve to fifteen may operate a cart on Peachtree City cart paths with a parent, grandparent or other guardian in the front seat. Those who are fifteen or older, with either a valid Georgia learner's permit or a full driver's license, are allowed to operate golf carts alone. Students at McIntosh High School are encouraged to drive family golf carts to school because of limited car parking. In 2015, Starr's Mill High School opened a golf-cart specific lot. The golf cart paths are also used by cyclists, joggers, and pedestrians as a safer alternative to the side of the road. In February 2003, Golf Digest magazine discussed the traffic congestion caused by the use of golf carts in the city.

Airports
Atlanta Regional Airport, also known as Falcon Field, is a general aviation airport that provides chartered air service. Since 1987, it has grown from having about 60 aircraft based at the airport to about 165. It mainly serves Peachtree City's business residents, but also serves as a place of entertainment for people interested. There is a viewing area provided for the public to watch aircraft take-off and land. The airport hosts many events throughout the year, including the Great Georgia Air Show. The airport is the location of a National Weather Service radar station, Southeast River Forecast Center, and Weather Forecast Office, which serves 96 counties in northern and central Georgia.

Peachtree City was designated a foreign-trade zone by the U.S. Customs Service. In the U.S., a foreign-trade zone is a site in or near a U.S. Customs port of entry (in this case Hartsfield–Jackson Atlanta International Airport), designated free of customs entry procedures.

Notable people
 Johnny Grunge, professional wrestler
 Sherrilyn Kenyon, #1 New York Times bestselling author
 Kelley O'Hara, USWNT player
 Reed Sorenson, NASCAR driver
 Travis Van Winkle, actor
 Stela Cole, singer-songwriter

References

Other sources
 "Welcome to Peachtree City-Falcon Field!" Peachtree City official website, October 11, 2008
 "Peachtree City Falcon Field – Peachtree City, GA" Waymark, October 11, 2008
 Aventure Aviation "Aventure Aviation Named Exporter of the Year" Hardin, April 10, 2009
"Peachtree City founder Joel Cowan shares vision of green space" by Janet Frankston, April 22, 2002

External links

 Peachtree City official website

Cities in Fayette County, Georgia
Cities in Georgia (U.S. state)
Planned cities in the United States
Special economic zones of the United States
Cities in the Atlanta metropolitan area